David Burnham (born 1933) is an American investigative journalist and author based in Washington, D.C. He rose to prominence in 1970 while writing a series of articles for The New York Times on police corruption, which inspired the 1973 film Serpico. He is also known for writing a series of articles about labor union activist Karen Silkwood, who mysteriously died while en route to meet Burnham to share evidence that the nuclear facility where she worked knew that its workers were exposed to unhealthy levels of plutonium. He is currently the co-director of the Transactional Records Access Clearinghouse, a project of the S.I. Newhouse School of Public Communications at Syracuse University.

Awards and honors 
 1968: George Polk Award for Community Service
 1972: Newspaper Reporters Association of New York City Schaefer Gold Typewriter Award for Public Service
 1987: Alicia Patterson Foundation Fellowship
 1990: Investigative Reporters and Editors Award for Best Book: A Law Unto Itself: Power, Politics, and the IRS
 1992: Rockefeller Foundation Fellowship in Bellagio, Italy
 2003: John Jay College of Criminal Justice Honorary Doctorate Degree in Humane Letters
 2006: National Freedom of Information Act Hall of Fame Inductee

Bibliography

Books 

 The Rise of the Computer State. New York: Random House, 1983. 
 A Law Unto Itself: Power, Politics, and the IRS. New York: Random House, 1989. 
 Above the Law: Secret Deals, Political Fixes, and Other Misadventures of the U.S. Department of Justice. New York: Scribner, 1996.

Selected articles 
 "Graft Paid to Police Here Said to Run Into Millions." The New York Times, April 25, 1970.
 "Death of Plutonium Worker Questioned by Union Official." The New York Times, November 19, 1974.

References

External links

Living people
1933 births
American male  journalists